The 1977 World Fencing Championships were held in Buenos Aires, Argentina. The event took place from July 14 to July 24, 1977.

Medal table

Medal summary

Men's events

Women's events

References

FIE Results

World Fencing Championships
Sports competitions in Buenos Aires
World Fencing Championships, 1977
1970s in Buenos Aires
International fencing competitions hosted by Argentina
1977 in fencing
July 1977 sports events in South America